The 13303 / 04 Dhanbad Junction - Ranchi Junction Intercity Express is an Express  train belonging to Indian Railways East Central Railway zone that runs between  and  in India.

Coaches
The 13303 / 04 Dhanbad Junction - Ranchi Junction Intercity Express has ten general unreserved & two SLR (seating with luggage rake) coaches . It does not carry a pantry car coach.

As is customary with most train services in India, coach composition may be amended at the discretion of Indian Railways depending on demand.

Service

Routing

Traction
As the route is electrified, a  based WAP-4 electric locomotive pulls the train to its destination.

References

External links
13303 Intercity Express at India Rail Info
13304 Intercity Express at India Rail Info

Intercity Express (Indian Railways) trains
Transport in Ranchi
Rail transport in Jharkhand
Rail transport in West Bengal
Transport in Dhanbad